Yekkeh Quz-e Bala (also Romanized as Yekkeh Qūz-e Bālā; also known as Yekkeh Qūz and Yakigov) is a village in Aq Su Rural District, in the Central District of Kalaleh County, Golestan Province, Iran. At the 2006 census, its population was 1,808, in 379 families.

References 

Populated places in Kalaleh County